Gerra (also known as Girra) is the Babylonian and Akkadian god of fire, derived from the earlier Sumerian deity Gibil. He is the son of Anu and Antu.

References 
Michael Jordan, Encyclopedia of Gods, Kyle Cathie Limited, 2002
Benjamin R. Foster, From Distant Days: Myths, Tales, and Poetry of Ancient Mesopotamia, 1995

External links
Ancient Mesopotamian Gods and Goddesses: Girra (god)

Mesopotamian gods
Fire gods